Waterfront City may refer to:

 Waterfront City - a precinct of Melbourne Docklands
 Waterfront City, Dubai, an area of Dubai Waterfront, currently under construction